Hildegarde Haas (1926–2002) was an American artist. She was born in Frankfurt, Germany and moved to the US with her parents in 1937.

Biography 
Haas attended the Colorado Springs Fine Arts Center for summer classes before attending the University of Chicago for two years. When she received a scholarship to the Art Students League of New York she began studying under Vaclav Vytlacil and Morris Kantor. After seven years she was forced to give up carving due to the physical demands of the craft and she picked up painting instead.

In 1951, Haas relocated to Northern California and became involved with Bay Area arts organizations.

Collections
Museum of Modern Art, New York
Smithsonian American Art Museum
National Gallery of Art, Washington
Dallas Museum of Art
Pennsylvania Academy of the Fine Arts
Cleveland Museum of Art

References

1926 births
2002 deaths
20th-century American women artists
Artists from Frankfurt
Art Students League of New York alumni
German emigrants to the United States
University of Chicago alumni